Blake Christopher Heron (January 11, 1982 – September 8, 2017) was an American actor. He is best known for his starring role as Marty Preston in the 1996 film Shiloh. He died of an accidental drug overdose, aged 35.

Early life
Heron was born in Rockville Centre, New York on January 11, 1982. After his parents divorced, he moved with his mother to Atlanta, then to New York City, and finally to Burbank, California, where he began his acting career.

Career
He made his film debut for the Disney film Tom and Huck (1995) and the television series Reality Check. When the series did not last, Heron starred in several television movies, including Trilogy of Terror II (1996). Nick Freno: Licensed Teacher (1996) was his biggest role at the age of 14. He played the flirtatious jock, Jordan. In 1997, he played the lead role of Marty Preston in the Warner Bros. film Shiloh.

After graduating from high school in 2000, Heron avoided child roles and took on more serious adult roles. In the HBO movie Cheaters (2000)  he played a conspiring dark teen, then had the same type of role in Blast (2000). After appearing in television hits such as Boston Public (2000), Family Law (1999) and The Guardian, he took on the role of Specialist Galen Bungum in We Were Soldiers (2002).  He also appeared in Dandelion (2004). He recently appeared in the movie A Thousand Junkies, which premiered at the 2017 Tribeca Film Festival, and was Heron's final film role before his death.

Death
Heron battled drug addiction since the age of 12 and completed drug rehab for heroin addiction.

On September 8, 2017, Heron was found unresponsive by his girlfriend in his Los Angeles home. He was pronounced dead, aged 35, after paramedics were unable to revive him. A friend reported that in his last days Heron had the flu, for which authorities found several prescription drugs; they found no illegal drugs.

Five months after his death, Heron's death was ruled an accidental drug overdose due to the "effects of multiple drugs," notably the opioid fentanyl.

Filmography

References

External links

1982 births
2017 deaths
Male actors from Los Angeles
American male child actors
American male film actors
Accidental deaths in California
Drug-related deaths in California
People from Sherman Oaks, Los Angeles